Acarosporina microspora is a species of fungus in the family Stictidaceae. A plant pathogen, it causes a condition in elms known as Schizoxylon canker. It was originally described in 1938 under the name Schizoxylon microsporum.

References 

Ostropales
Fungi described in 1938
Fungal tree pathogens and diseases